White Sun is an American band. They are popular for musically blending different styles and genres. The group comprises Gurujas Khalsa, Harijiwan Khalsa and Adam Berry.

Awards Discography

References 

American musical groups